Humphrey Searle (26 August 1915 – 12 May 1982) was an English composer and writer on music. His music combines aspects of late Romanticism and modernist serialism, particularly reminiscent of his primary influences, Franz Liszt, Arnold Schoenberg and Anton Webern, who was briefly his teacher. As a writer on music, Searle published texts on numerous topics; he was an authority on the music of Franz Liszt, and created the initial cataloguing system for his works.

Biography
Searle was the son of Humphrey and Charlotte Searle and, through his mother, a grandson of Sir William Schlich. He was born in Oxford where he was a classics scholar before studying—somewhat hesitantly—with John Ireland at the Royal College of Music in London, after which he went to Vienna on a six-month scholarship to become a private pupil of Anton Webern, which became decisive in his composition career.

Searle was one of the foremost pioneers of serial music in the United Kingdom, and used his role as a producer at the BBC from 1946 to 1948 to promote it. He was General Secretary of the International Society for Contemporary Music from 1947 to 1949. He accepted this post with the encouragement of the new president, Edward Clark. For Clark, he composed the Quartet for Clarinet, Bassoon, Violin and Viola, Op. 12, a musical palindrome.

Searle wrote his Piano Sonata, Op. 21 for a recital at the Wigmore Hall on 22 October 1951, given by the Australian pianist Gordon Watson to celebrate the 140th anniversary of the birth of Franz Liszt. (Watson also performed the complete Transcendental Études on that occasion.) The Sonata was loosely based on Liszt's Sonata in B minor and has been described as "probably, both the finest and most original piano work ever produced by a British composer".

Other works of note include a Poem for 22 Strings (1950), premiered at Darmstadt, a Gogol opera, The Diary of a Madman (1958, awarded the first prize at UNESCO's International Rostrum of Composers in 1960), and five symphonies (the first of which was commercially recorded by the London Philharmonic Orchestra conducted by Sir Adrian Boult).

He also composed film scores, including music for The Baby and the Battleship (1956), Beyond Mombasa (1956), Action of the Tiger (1957), The Abominable Snowman (1957), Law and Disorder (1958), Left Right and Centre (1959), October Moth (1960) and The Haunting (1963), as well the 1965 Doctor Who serial The Myth Makers.

Searle also contributed humorous compositions to some of the Hoffnung Music Festivals, including a setting of Young Lochinvar and a parody of serialism, Punkt Kontrapunkt.

Searle taught throughout his life; his notable students included Hugh Davidson, Brian Elias, Michael Finnissy, Jonathan Elias, Nicola LeFanu, Alistair Hinton, Geoffrey King, and Graham Newcater and Wolfgang Rihm. 

Searle wrote the monographs Twentieth Century Counterpoint and The Music of Franz Liszt. He also developed the most authoritative catalogue of Liszt's works, which are frequently identified using Searle's numbering system, abbreviated as "S.".

Searle married Fiona Nicholson in 1960. He died in London in 1982, aged 66.

List of works
Source

Operas 
 The Diary of a Madman (1958)
 The Photo of the Colonel (1963–64)
 Hamlet (1964–68)

Ballets 
 Noctambules (1956)
 The Great Peacock (1957–58)
 Dualities (1963)

Orchestral 
 Variations on an Elizabethan Theme, jointly composed with Lennox Berkeley, Benjamin Britten, Arthur Oldham, Michael Tippett and William Walton (1953)
 Symphony No. 1 (1953)
 Symphony No. 2 (1956–58)
 Symphony No. 3 (1959–60)
 Symphony No. 4 (1961–62)
 Symphony No. 5 (1964)
 Sinfonietta (1968–69)
 Labyrinth (1971)
 Three Ages (1982)

Piano concertos 
 Piano Concerto No. 1 (1944)
 Piano Concerto No. 2 (1955)

Suites 
 Suite No. 1 for Strings (1942)
 Suite No. 2 (1943)
 Night Music (1943)
 Poem for 22 Strings (1950)
 Concertante for Piano, Strings and Percussion (1954)
 Scherzi (1964)
 Hamlet Suite (1968)
 Zodiac Variations (1970)
 Tamesis (1979)

Chorus and instruments 
 Gold Coast Customs (1947–49) for speakers, male chorus and orchestra
 The Riverrun (Joyce) (1951) for speakers and orchestra
 The Shadow of Cain (1952) for speakers, male chorus and orchestra
 Jerusalem (1970) for speakers, tenor, chorus and orchestra
 My Beloved Spake (1976) for chorus and organ
 Dr Faustus (1977) for solo woman, chorus and orchestra

Voice and orchestra 
 3 Songs of Jocelyn Brooke (1954) for high voice and ensemble
 Oxus (1967) for tenor and orchestra
 Contemplations (1975) for mezzo-soprano and orchestra
 Kubla Khan (1973) for tenor and orchestra

Unaccompanied chorus 

 The Canticle of the Rose (Sitwell, 1965)
 Rhyme Rude to My Pride (1974) for male chorus

Chamber music 
 Bassoon Quintet (1945)
 Intermezzo for 11 Instruments (1946)
 Quartet for Clarinet, Bassoon, Violin and Viola, Op. 12 (1948; a musical palindrome)
 Passacaglietta in nomine Arnold Schoenberg (1949) for string quartet
 Gondoliera (1950) for celesta and piano
 3 Cat Poems (1951/53): "The Owl and the Pussy-Cat" for speaker, flute, cello and guitar and "Two Practical Cats" for speaker, flute/piccolo, cello and guitar
 Suite for Clarinet and Piano (1956)
 Three Movements for String Quartet (1959)
 Cello Fantasia (1972)
 Il Penseroso e L'Allegro (1975) for cello and piano

Song cycle 
 Les fleurs du mal (1972) for tenor, horn and piano

Songs 
 Two Songs of A.E. Housman, op. 9 (1946): March Past (On the idle hill of summer) and The Stinging-Nettle, for voice and piano
 Counting the Beats (1963) for high voice and piano

Piano 
 Sonata (1951)
 Suite (1955)
 Prelude on a Theme by Rawsthorne (1965)

Guitar 
 Five Op.61 (1974)

Selected bibliography
Source

References

Sources

External links

 Humphrey Searle: British Composer (1915–1982)
 Humphrey Searle, profile by Robert Clements, Classical Net
 
 Images of Humphrey Searle on the National Portrait Gallery website

1915 births
1982 deaths
20th-century classical composers
20th-century English musicians
Alumni of the Royal College of Music
British ballet composers
English classical composers
English musicologists
English opera composers
Male opera composers
English male classical composers
Franz Liszt
International Rostrum of Composers prize-winners
People from Oxford
Twelve-tone and serial composers
20th-century British composers
20th-century British musicologists
20th-century British male musicians
Liszt scholars
BBC radio producers